Sir Albert James Bennett, 1st Baronet JP (17 September 1872 – 14 December 1945) was a politician in the United Kingdom who was elected both as a Liberal Party Member of Parliament (MP) and as a Conservative Party MP.

Biography
From 1914 to 1919, he was Controller of Propaganda, Central and South America.

As a Liberal, in 1918 he unsuccessfully contested the Chippenham constituency in Wiltshire.  At the 1922 general election he stood in Mansfield, unseating the Labour MP William Carter.  However, he lost the Mansfield seat at the 1923 general election, and in 1924 he was elected as a Conservative in the Nottingham Central seat. He was re-elected in 1929, but resigned from Parliament the following year following bankruptcy.

He took possession of Kirklington Hall, Nottinghamshire, in 1920. On 31 July 1929, he was made a baronet, of Kirklington in the county of Nottinghamshire.

Family 

In 1896 he married Caroline Carleton Backus, daughter of American brewing magnate Jacob Backus, by whom he had two sons and one daughter; the eldest son, Charles, inherited the baronetcy.  A barrister and Metropolitan Police Court Magistrate, he served in the British Army in both World War I and World War II, and was promoted to the rank of lieutenant colonel in the Sherwood Rangers Yeomanry.

Caroline and Albert were divorced in 1938, and Albert remarried in May to Leopoldine Armata. They had one son, Peter Bennett, born on 18 August 1938.  Sir Albert died in 1945, aged 73.

References

Further reading
 
 ThePeerage.com: Sir Albert James Bennett, 1st Bt.

External links 
 

1872 births
1945 deaths
Baronets in the Baronetage of the United Kingdom
Conservative Party (UK) MPs for English constituencies
Liberal Party (UK) MPs for English constituencies
UK MPs 1922–1923
UK MPs 1924–1929
UK MPs 1929–1931
Sherwood Rangers Yeomanry officers